Lenny Joseph (born 12 October 2000) is a French professional footballer who plays as a forward for Metz.

Career
Joseph began his senior career with  Le Puy and the reserves of Boulogne. After strong performances in the 2020–21 Coupe de France, he signed a professional contract with FC Metz in the summer of 2021. He made his professional debut with Metz in a 3–3 Ligue 1 tie with Lille 8 August 2021.

References

External links
 
 FC MetzProfile

2000 births
Living people
Footballers from Paris
French footballers
Association football forwards
Ligue 1 players
Championnat National 2 players
Championnat National 3 players
FC Metz players